Lowman may refer to:

Places
 Lowman, Idaho, United States, an unincorporated rural census-designated place
 Lowman, New York, United States, a hamlet
 Mount Lowman, Usarp Mountains, Antarctica
 10739 Lowman, an asteroid
 Lowman Hall, South Carolina State College, a historic academic building in Orangeburg, South Carolina, United States

People and fictional characters
 Lowman (surname), a list of people and fictional characters
 Lowman Pauling, a member of The "5" Royales American R&B group

See also
 Loman (disambiguation)